The 1994 Cincinnati Bearcats football team represented the University of Cincinnati during the 1994 NCAA Division I-A football season. The Bearcats, led by first-year head coach Rick Minter, participated as independents and played their home games at Nippert Stadium.

Schedule

References

Cincinnati
Cincinnati Bearcats football seasons
Cincinnati Bearcats football